{{DISPLAYTITLE:H2NO}}
H2NO was an upselling campaign by The Coca-Cola Company to dissuade consumers from ordering tap water drinks at restaurants, and to instead order more profitable soft drinks, non-carbonated beverages, or bottled water. The campaign's title, H2NO, reflects the program's purpose, which is to have customers say No to H2O, the chemical formula for water.

In July 2001, a link to a story about the program's success at Olive Garden was posted to Cockeyed.com. The link was reposted around the internet, until the story was taken down by Coca-Cola on August 2, 2001, for fears it might be misinterpreted. On August 20, 2001, the story was covered by The New York Times, and subsequently by a number of news providers.

The campaign ran only in the United States.

Discovery and Coca-Cola response
The H2NO campaign had been conducted through an Internet memo to distributors and restaurants.  In July 2001, Rob Cockerham, a graphic designer in Sacramento, came across the Olive Garden success story following an online search, and posted a link to the story on his website, Cockeyed.com. In an interview with The New York Times, Cockerham noted how "I had to assure more than one person that this was not a prank, and that it was a real article from Coca-Cola."

On August 2, 2001, about a week after the success story link was posted to Cockeyed.com, the Coca-Cola portal was closed.  Polly Howes, a spokeswoman for Coca-Cola, stated that the story might be misinterpreted by "folks who aren't in a sales-related business" and that the site was due to be dismantled.

Following the New York Times article, the story was covered by major news providers, including Sunday Herald Sun, Evening Standard and was featured on The Glass House.

Olive Garden success story

In a success story on Coca-Cola's online public relations portal, entitled "The Olive Targets Tap Water & WINS", Coca-Cola described the purpose, implementation, and success in reducing "tap water incidence".

Coca-Cola stated that customers chose tap water out of habit, and that selling alternative beverages would increase guest satisfaction:

Water. It's necessary to sustain life, but to many Casual Dining restaurant chains it contributes to a dull dining experience for the customer. Many customers choose tap water not because they enjoy it, but because it is what they always have drunk in the past. In response, some restaurant chains are implementing programs to help train crews to sell alternative choices to tap water, like soft drinks and non-carbonated beverages, with the goal of increasing overall guest satisfaction. 

Olive Garden's stated goal was "to influence customers to abandon their default choice of tap water and experience other beverage choices to improve their dining experience".

The Olive Garden suffered from a "high water incidence rate" and "wanted their restaurant crews to emphasize the broad array of alternative beverage selections available" so as "to influence customers to abandon their default choice of tap water and experience other beverage choices to improve their dining experience." In response, the Coca-Cola USA-Fountain offered the tap water reduction program H2NO. The H2NO program featured "beverage suggestive selling techniques (a technique used when a server suggests a profitable beverage in place of water to the customer during the ordering process)." Alternative beverages including soft drinks, non-carbonated beverages and alcohol would be offered which would lead to higher "overall check averages" and greater profits. To further improve the effectiveness of the program, the "Olive Garden developed an employee incentive contest linked to H2NO with CCUSA-Fountain called 'Just Say No to H2O.'"

The success story noted how "because of its own successful campaign against water, The Olive Garden has recently sent a powerful message to the entire restaurant industry - less water and more beverage choices mean happier customers" stating how:

When the contest was completed, almost all participating restaurants realized significant increases in beverage sales and reduced levels of tap water incidence - a strong indication that Olive Garden restaurants succeeded in enhancing the customer's dining experience. And perhaps most importantly, Olive Garden expects to see this trend continue as the skills learned become part of the crew's everyday interaction with restaurant customers.

Criticism

The program and Olive Garden success story were widely ridiculed.

On August 22, 2001, Peter Gleick, the director of the Pacific Institute, wrote a letter to the editor of The New York Times, criticizing the campaign, noting how "both PepsiCo and Coca-Cola use perfectly potable tap water as the source of their bottled waters, Aquafina and Dasani. I guess tap water is O.K., if we can be made to pay for it."

In a report by Corporate Accountability International, Tapping Congress to Get Off the Bottle, the report criticized the campaign as part of how "bottlers have employed a range of marketing tactics that have overtly disparaged the tap." The Olive Garden success story and the H2NO program have been cited in literature as examples of the bottled water industry's aggressive advertising campaigns which views tap water as an impediment to increased profits.

See also
 List of promotional campaigns by Coca-Cola
 Nestlé boycott (targeting that company's promotion of breast milk substitutes)

References

External links 
 Official webpage by Coca-Cola, which was screenshotted and re-published by the magazine Stay Free! and subsequently archived by the Internet Archive on this page.

Advertising in the United States
Promotional campaigns by Coca-Cola
Drinking water